Futagawa (written: 二川 lit. "two rivers") is a Japanese surname. Notable people with the surname include:

, Japanese film director and writer
, Japanese footballer

See also
, a station of the Tōkaidō in Toyohashi, Aichi Prefecture, Japan
, a railway station in Toyohashi, Aichi Prefecture, Japan

Japanese-language surnames